Reginald Joseph Gibson (10 December 1912 – 26 July 1969) was an Australian rules footballer who played with Collingwood and South Melbourne in the Victorian Football League (VFL).

After his football career he served in the Royal Australian Navy in World War II.

Notes

External links 

Reg Gibson's profile at Collingwood Forever

1912 births
1969 deaths
Australian rules footballers from Melbourne
Collingwood Football Club players
Sydney Swans players
Royal Australian Navy personnel of World War II
Royal Australian Navy sailors
People from Fairfield, Victoria
Military personnel from Melbourne